Robin Austin, is a Canadian businessman and former politician. Austin served as the New Democratic Party MLA for Skeena in the  province of British Columbia.  Austin was first elected to the Legislative Assembly in the 2005 election. Austin was re-elected in the 2009 election. He declined to seek re-election in 2017.

Life history
Austin was born in London, England on April 9, 1958, but at the age of six weeks he returned with his family to Ghana, West Africa, where he remained until he was ten years old. At age ten he was sent to a British boarding school, because his father, who worked for an international company in the resource industry, moved the family frequently, and they wanted him to have some stability in his schooling.

After graduating, he attended Strathclyde University in Scotland where he received his Bachelor of Arts with a specialization in hotel management. His first job out of university was at a hotel on Grand Cayman, in the Cayman Islands. It was there that Austin met his wife Colleen, who was from Victoria, British Columbia. It wasn't long before they fell in love and moved to Toronto, where Austin worked for The Four Seasons, Hilton, and Renaissance Hotels.

After several years in Toronto, Colleen began to miss the West Coast, so they decided to return to British Columbia, and make a life in Victoria. It was here that their son, Graeme, was born. While living in Victoria, Robin opened Camille's Restaurant.

When Graeme was only a year old Austin was offered a position as catering manager at the University of British Columbia. He took the job and the family moved to Vancouver where they stayed from 1990 to 1995. It was in 1995 that the couple decided to try life in a smaller city, believing that it would offer their son the opportunity to grow up in a more healthy environment than either Vancouver or Victoria could offer.  After much deliberation, the two of them finally decided to move to Terrace, British Columbia.

Austin initially began working at the Terrace Best Western Hotel as food service manager, but within six weeks he had been promoted to relief manager. This position continued until 1999, when he was laid off due to the overall economic downturn in the area. Consequently, Austin decided to return to school, choosing to complete a Bachelor of Social Work from the University of Northern British Columbia.

Soon after moving to Terrace, Robin and Colleen decided to become foster parents, and when Graeme was only six years old they began caring for another child, who was eight. They have continuously cared for foster children since then, many of them teenagers of first nations descent.

Austin also connects with his supporters through Facebook.

Political beginnings

Austin's decision to go into politics was partially motivated by his belief that the BC Liberal government had a lack of concern for people in the Northwest who were affected by the economic downturn at the beginning of the millennium. Having lost his own job because of a sagging economy linked to the softwood lumber dispute and low commodity prices, Austin was frustrated by the province's lack of support for economic development in the North.

As a result, in 2004 he sought the BC NDP nomination for the Skeena constituency. He won the nomination after three ballots, and stood as the NDP candidate, narrowly winning the 2005 election.

On May 12, 2009, Austin was re-elected winning with the clear majority.

Fisheries

Austin is the Fisheries Critic for the NDP shadow cabinet. As chair of the Special Committee on Sustainable Aquaculture, Robin has travelled extensively through the province, listening to concerns about the social, economic and environmental impacts of aquaculture.

Members of Austin's constituency depend on a healthy wild salmon run for tourism, and for both sport and commercial fishing. Consequently, the large body of evidence suggesting that open net fish farms may lead to a decline in the population of wild salmon in river and ocean systems where they are located has led to widespread antagonism towards open net fish farming in Northern British Columbia, and particularly in the Skeena area.

The Special Committee on Sustainable Aquaculture, which was chaired by Austin, tabled its final report in May 2007. The report included 55 recommendations on how to manage the British Columbia aquaculture industry in a way that was both economically feasible and environmentally responsible.

The report drew widespread criticism from the aquaculture industry because it called for the industry to move to ocean-based closed containment within five years. According to the report, open net fish farms may contribute to the decline of wild salmon populations through the spread of parasitic sea lice and diseases from the farmed fish to migrating salmon fry. The industry claims that moving to closed-containment is tantamount to ending finfish aquaculture off the British Columbia coast.

Electoral record

|-
 
|NDP
|Robin Austin
|align="right"|5,865
|align="right"|50.77
|align="right"| +2.47
|align="right"|$68,501

|Conservative
|Michael Brousseau
|align="right"|893
|align="right"|7.73
|align="right"|
|align="right"|$6,594

|- style="background:white;"
! style="text-align:right;" colspan="3"|Total Valid Votes
!align="right"|11,553
!align="right"|100%
|- style="background:white;"
! style="text-align:right;" colspan="3"|Total Rejected Ballots
!align="right"|64
!align="right"|0.7%
|- style="background:white;"
! style="text-align:right;" colspan="3"|Turnout
!align="right"|11,617
!align="right"|55%
|}

|-
 
|NDP
|Robin Austin
|align="right"|6,166
|align="right"|48.12%
|align="right"|
|align="right"|$56,311

|-

|- style="background:white;"
! style="text-align:right;" colspan="3"|Total Valid Votes
!align="right"|12,813
!align="right"|100%
|- style="background:white;"
! style="text-align:right;" colspan="3"|Total Rejected Ballots
!align="right"|89
!align="right"|0.7%
|- style="background:white;"
! style="text-align:right;" colspan="3"|Turnout
!align="right"|12,902
!align="right"|63%
|}

External links
Robin's NDP Caucus Page
Robin's Flickr Picture Page
 Special Committee on Sustainable Aquaculture
Hansard Debates
Source for Hansard quotes marked 2/21/07 Vol.14 No.9
Source for Hansard quotes marked 3/14/07 Vol.16 No.7
Source for Hansard quote marked 11/27/06 Vol.13 No.9
Special Committee on Sustainable Aquaculture Final Report

1958 births
British Columbia New Democratic Party MLAs
Living people
Alumni of the University of Strathclyde
University of Northern British Columbia alumni
21st-century Canadian politicians